Lorenzo Veracini is a historian and professor at Swinburne University of Technology’s Institute for Social Research. He is the editor in chief of Settler Colonial Studies and has been a key figure in the development of the field of settler colonialism. His 2010 book Settler Colonialism: A Theoretical Overview was described as "comprehensive though succinct" and "probably the best justification of the imperative to view settler colonialism as significantly different from traditional or classical colonialism".

Works

References

Academic staff of Swinburne University of Technology
Scholars of settler colonialism
Australian historians
Year of birth missing (living people)
Living people